The list of ship decommissionings in 1975 includes a chronological list of all ships decommissioned in 1975.


See also 

1975
 Ship decommissionings
Ship